Mount Holloway is a mountain,  high, standing between Swinford Glacier and Table Bay, in the Queen Alexandra Range of Antarctica. It was named by the Advisory Committee on Antarctic Names for Harry L. Holloway, a United States Antarctic Research Program biologist at McMurdo Station in 1964–65.

References

Mountains of the Ross Dependency
Shackleton Coast